Tangyin railway station is a station on Beijing–Guangzhou railway in Tangyin County, Anyang, Henan.

There is a stone tablet carved in 1942 on Platform 1 indicating the hometown of Yue Fei.

History
The station was opened in 1904.

References

Railway stations in Henan
Stations on the Beijing–Guangzhou Railway
Railway stations in China opened in 1904